Wood ash is the powdery residue remaining after the combustion of wood, such as burning wood in a fireplace, bonfire, or an industrial power plant. It is largely composed of calcium compounds along with other non-combustible trace elements present in the wood. It has been used for many purposes throughout history.

Composition

Variability in assessment
A comprehensive set of analyses of wood ash composition from many tree species has been carried out by Emil Wolff, among others. Several factors have a major impact on the composition:
Fine ash: Some studies include the solids escaping via the flue during combustion, while others do not.
Temperature of combustion. Ash content yield decreases with increasing combustion temperature which produces two direct effects:
Dissociation: Conversion of carbonates, sulfides, etc., to oxides results in no carbon, sulfur, carbonates, or sulfides. Some metallic oxides (e.g. mercuric oxide) even dissociate to their elemental state and/or vaporize completely at wood fire temperatures (.)
Volatilization: In studies in which the escaped ash is not measured, some combustion products may not be present at all.
Experimental process: If the ashes are exposed to the environment between combustion and the analysis, oxides may convert back to carbonates by reacting with carbon dioxide in the air. Hygroscopic substances meanwhile may absorb atmospheric moisture.
Type, age, and growing environment of the wood stock affect the composition of the wood (e.g. hardwood and softwood), and thus the ash. Hardwoods usually produce more ash than softwoods with bark and leaves producing more than internal parts of the trunk.

Measurements
According to one research on the average the burning of wood results in about 6–10% ashes. Also the conditions of the combustion affect the composition and amount of the residue ash, thus higher temperature will reduce the ash yield.

Elemental analysis 
Typically, wood ash contains the following major elements:

 Carbon (C) — 5–30%.
 Calcium (Ca) — 7–33%
 Potassium (K) — 3–4%
 Magnesium (Mg) — 1–2%
 Manganese (Mn) — 0.3–1.3%
 Phosphorus (P) — 0.3–1.4%
 Sodium (Na) — 0.2–0.5%.

Chemical compounds 
As the wood burns, it produces different compounds depending on the temperature used. Some studies cite calcium carbonate as the major constituent, others find no carbonate at all but calcium oxide instead. The latter is produced at higher temperatures (see calcination).

Much of wood ash contains calcium carbonate (CaCO3) as its major component, representing 25% or even 45% of total ash weight. At  CaCO3 and K2CO3 were identified in one case. Less than 10% is potash, and less than 1% is phosphate.

Trace elements 
There are trace elements of iron (Fe), manganese (Mn), zinc (Zn), copper (Cu) and some heavy metals. Their concentrations in ash vary due combustion temperature. Decomposition of carbonates and the volatilization of potassium (K), sulfur (S), and trace amounts of copper (Cu) and boron (B) may result from increased temperature. The study has found that at raised temperature K, S, B, sodium (Na) and copper (Cu) decreased, whereas Mg, P, Mn, Al, Fe, and Si did not change relative to calcium (Ca). All of these trace elements are, however, present in the form of oxides at higher temperature of combustion. Some elements in wood ash (all fractions given in mass/mass) include:

 Fe 1.6-55 ‰
 Si 6-170 ‰
 Al 1.2-45 ‰
 Mn 1-20 ‰
 As 0.6-50 ppm
 Cd 0.18-60 ppm
 Pb 2-500 ppm
 Cr 12-280 ppm
 Ni 10-140 ppm
 V 1.8-120 ppm

Fuels 
One study has determined that a slowly burning wood emissions typically include 16 alkenes, 5 alkadienes, 5 alkynes and several alkanes and arenes in proportions. Ethene, acetylene and benzene were a major part at efficient combustion. Proportion of C3-C7 alkenes were found to be higher for smouldering. Benzene and 1,3-butadiene constituted ~10–20% and ~1–2% by weight of total non-methane hydrocarbons.

Uses

Fertilizers 

Wood ash can be used as a fertilizer used to enrich agricultural soil nutrition. In this role, wood ash serves as a source of potassium and calcium carbonate, the latter acting as a liming agent to neutralize acidic soils.

Wood ash can also be used as an amendment for organic hydroponic solutions, generally replacing inorganic compounds containing calcium, potassium, magnesium and phosphorus.

Composts 

Wood ash is commonly disposed of in landfills, but with rising disposal costs, ecologically friendly alternatives, such as serving as compost for agricultural and forestry applications, are becoming more popular. Because wood ash has a high char content, it can be used as an odor control agent, especially in composting operations.

Pottery 
Wood ash has a very long history of being used in ceramic glazes, particularly in the Chinese, Japanese and Korean traditions, though now used by many craft potters. It acts as a flux, reducing the melting point of the glaze.

Soaps  
For thousands of years, plant or wood ash was leached with water, to yield an impure solution of potassium carbonate. This product could be mixed with oils or fats to produce a soft "soap" or soap like-product, as was done in ancient Sumeria, Europe, and Egypt. However only certain types of plants could produce a soap that actually lathered. Later, medieval European soapmakers treated the wood ash solution with slaked lime, which contains calcium hydroxide, to get a hydroxide-rich solution for soapmaking. However it was not until the invention of the Leblanc process that high quality sodium hydroxide could be mass produced, rendering obsolete the earlier forms of soap using crude wood or plant ash. This was a revolutionary discovery that facilitated the modern soapmaking industry.

Bio-leaching
The ectomycorrhizal fungi Suillus granulatus and Paxillus involutus can release elements from wood ash.

Food preparation 
Wood ash is sometimes used in the process of nixtamalization, where corn is soaked and cooked in an alkali solution to improve nutritional content and decrease risk of mycotoxins. The alkali solution has historically been made from wood ash lye.

An early leavened bread was baked as early as 6000 BC by the Sumerians by placing the bread on heated stones and covering it with hot ash. The minerals in the wood ash could have supplemented the nutritional content of the dough as it was baked. In present day, the amount of wood ash content in bread flour, as measured by the Chopin alveograph, is strictly regulated by France.

See also
Ash burner (traditional occupation)
Bottom ash
Charcoal
Fly ash

Notes

References

Waste
Incineration
Organic fertilizers
Types of ash

de:Asche
es:Ceniza
fr:Cendre
it:Cenere
ht:Sann